Judith C. Giordan is an American chemist and businesswoman who is Professor of Practice at Oregon State University. She serves as President Elect of the American Chemical Society. She was awarded the 2010 Garvan–Olin Medal.

Early life and education 
Giordan was an undergraduate student at Rutgers University, where she earned a Bachelor's degree in environmental science. She moved to the University of Maryland, College Park for doctoral research on unsaturated hydrocarbons. After earning her doctorate, Giordan joined the Goethe University Frankfurt, where she worked as an Alexander von Humboldt Foundation fellow. After graduating, Giordan joined the Henkel Corporation, where she worked in research and development.

Research and career 
Giordan worked as a Vice President of Research and Development at PepsiCo.

Giordan works on research and training programs, as well as commercial development.  She is the founder of ecosVC, an organization that looks to translate research into commercially successful innovations, and the Chemical Agent Network.

In 2015, the Alexander von Humboldt Foundation supported Giordan in establishing a network of women innovators. The network looked to support women working in science and technology around the world.

Awards and honors 

 1980 Alexander von Humboldt Postdoctoral Fellow
 1990 Who's Who in Research and American Women
 2010 Garvan–Olin Medal
 2013 Elected Fellow of the American Chemical Society
 2014 American Chemical Society Henry Whalen Award
 2015 Alexander von Humboldt Alumni Networking Award
 2022 President Elect of the American Chemical Society

Selected publications

References 

Oregon State University faculty
University of Maryland, College Park alumni
Rutgers University alumni
PepsiCo people
Living people
20th-century American chemists
21st-century American chemists
American women scientists
Year of birth missing (living people)
20th-century American women scientists
21st-century American women scientists